The Haludovo Palace Hotel is an abandoned resort hotel on the Croatian island Krk north of Malinska. The hotel is named after a nearby beach.

Haludovo was built in 1971. Bob Guccione, the founder of Penthouse magazine, invested 45 million US dollars in the project and officially opened the Penthouse Adriatic Club casino located in the hotel in 1972.  However, the casino went bankrupt the following year and was closed.

Due to constraints on foreign investment in communist Yugoslavia, the hotel was owned by the Rijeka-based Brodokomerc 'company'.  During the Yugoslav Wars the hotel became a shelter for refugees.  In 1995, the hotel was privatized and went through a number of owners.  It hosted its last guests in 2001.

Today the hotel resort is abandoned with the interior effectively destroyed while the buildings remain intact.  As of November, 2018 signs in the local area still reflected directions to the hotel complex.

In October 2018, it was announced that an investor had plans to redevelop the venue into a closed resort with outside investment. 
However, this would also entail closing off beach access to the public and would interrupt the continuous beach promenade between Malinska and Njivice. The City of Malinska, state administration, and locals oppose this request.

References 

Modern ruins
Abandoned buildings and structures
Defunct hotels
Hotel buildings completed in 1971
Buildings and structures in Primorje-Gorski Kotar County
Casinos completed in 1972
Hotels in Croatia